The following is a list of notable events and releases of the year 2009 in Norwegian music.

Events

January
 23
 Nordlysfestivalen started in Tromsø (January 23 – 31).
 Marianne Beate Kielland (mezzo-soprano) was awarded the Nordlysprisen 2009 at Nordlysfestivalen.

February
 4 – The Polarjazz Festival 2009 started in Longyearbyen (February 4–8).
 5 – Kristiansund Opera Festival opened (February 5 – 21).

March
 10 – Varg Vikernes was released on parole having served almost 16 years of a 21 years (life) sentence for the murder of Mayhem guitarist Euronymous.
 18
 Vossajazz started in Voss (March 18–20).
 Kjetil Møster was awarded Vossajazzprisen 2009.
 19 – Solveig Slettahjell performs the commissioned work Tarpan Seasons for Vossajazz 2009.

April
 22 – SoddJazz 2009 started in Inderøy, Nord-Trøndelag (April 22 – 26).
 28 –  Bergenfest 2009 started in Bergen (April 28 – May 3).

May
 16 – Alexander Rybak won the Eurovision Song Contest 2009 with his song "Fairytale" in Moscow, giving Norway its third victory. Within a couple of days, the song reaches the top ten in charts in most of Europe, including a No. 10 entry in the UK Singles Chart.
 20
The start of Bergen International Music Festival Festspillene i Bergen 2009 (May 20 – June 4).
 Nattjazz 2010 started in Bergen (May 26 – 30).

June
 11 – Norwegian Wood 2009 started in Oslo, Norway (June 11 – 14).
 18 – The Norwegian Arctic Philharmonic Orchestra, Nordnorsk Opera og Symfoniorkester, was founded in Tromsø.

July
 13 – Moldejazz started in Molde (July 13 – 18).

August
 9 – Oslo Jazzfestival started (August 9 – 15).
 12 – Sildajazz starts in Haugesund (August 12 – 16).

September
 2 – The 5th Punktfestivalen started in Kristiansand (September 2 – 5).
 24 – The 6th Ekkofestival started in Bergen (September 24 – 26).

October
 22 – The 8th Insomnia Festival started in Tromsø (October 22 – 24).

November
 3 – The Oslo World Music Festival started in Oslo (November 3 – 8).
 12 – The 4th Barents Jazz, Tromsø International Jazz Festival started (November 12 – 14).

December
 11 – The Nobel Peace Prize Concert was held at Telenor Arena.

Albums released

January

February

March

April
 16 – Remembrance by Ketil Bjørnstad (ECM Records)

May

June

July

August

September

October
 12 – Restored, Returned by Tord Gustavsen Emsemble (ECM Records)

November

December

Unknown date
#

A

Deaths

January
 8 – Björn Haugan, operatic lyric tenor (born 1942).

February
 10 – Eva Gustavson, operatic contralto (born 1917).

March
 5 – Bjørg Lødøen, painter, graphic artist, and composer (born 1931).
 26 – Arne Bendiksen, singer, entertainer and record producer (born 1926).

May
 1 – Torstein Grythe, founder and conductor of the Sølvguttene boys choir (born 1918).

 August
 4 – Ole A. Sørli, musician, writer, and record producer (born 1946).

 November
 6 – Kjell Bartholdsen, jazz saxophonist (stroke) (born 1938).
 21 – Gerhard Aspheim, jazz trombonist (born 1930).

See also
 2009 in Norway
 Music of Norway
 Norway in the Eurovision Song Contest 2009

References

 
Norwegian music
Norwegian
Music
2000s in Norwegian music